Dr. Joseph Ssekandi is a Ugandan academic and academic administrator, who serves as the Dean of the Faculty of Agriculture at Uganda Martyrs University, a private university affiliated with the Roman Catholic Church in Uganda.

Background and education
Joseph was born in Nkozi Village, Mpigi District, in the Buganda Region of Uganda in the 1970s. He attended Saint Mugagga Nkozi Primary School, before transferring to Saint Balikudembe Secondary School in Mpigi District, where he completed his O-Level and A-Level education.

Later, he was admitted to Uganda Martyrs University (UMU), graduating with a Bachelor of Arts degree in Development Studies. He followed that with a Postgraduate Diploma in Learning and Teaching also from UMU.

He holds a Master of Science degree in Environment and Development, from the University of Reading in Berkshire, United Kingdom. His Doctor of Philosophy in Dry Land Resources Management, was awarded by the University of Nairobi, in 2017.

Career
After completing his A-Level studies, Joseph's father, Matia Nyakamwe, ran out of tuition money to send his son to university. Joseph took up a job as a security guard at UMU, working in that capacity for three years. An employee of the university, Evelyn Ayot, noticed his demeanor and good English language and encouraged him to apply to UMU. He was admitted and obtained a £2,000 annual scholarship from Dorothy Whitworth, a British citizen. During the transitional first semester, he continued to work  a security guard at night, while attending class during the day.

After his master's degree in the United Kingdom, he secured a job on a horse farm, in the UK. However, when he came to visit relatives in Uganda, UMU offered him a job as the administrator of the UMU School of Diplomacy, so he stayed. That was 2009.

After his PhD studies, Uganda Martyrs University appointed him as Dean of Faculty of Agriculture, where he still serves, as of October 2018.

Family
Joseph Ssekandi is a married father of four children.

See also
 Charles Olweny
 John Maviiri

References

External links
Website of Uganda Martyrs University
University of Nairobi: Doctor of Philosophy Defense: Mr. Joseph Ssekandi As of 16 November 2017.

1970s births
Living people
Uganda Martyrs University alumni
Alumni of the University of Reading
University of Nairobi alumni
Academic staff of Uganda Martyrs University